

The Aero A.26 was a Czechoslovakian military reconnaissance biplane aircraft built by Aero Vodochody in the 1920s. It was Aero's last design to be based on the Hansa-Brandenburg B.I aircraft that the company had been building under licence during World War I as the Ae.10.

It first flew in 1923 and a small series was built. They were later used in the Czechoslovak civilian aviation.

Specifications

Operators

See also

External links
Photo at Ugolok Neba site
Photos

1920s Czechoslovakian military reconnaissance aircraft
Single-engined tractor aircraft
A026
Biplanes
Aircraft first flown in 1923